Charles E. Sinclair (c. 1828 – March 11, 1887) was a justice of the Supreme Court of the Utah Territory from 1857 to 1860.

Born in Virginia, Sinclair was appointed to the Utah territorial supreme court in 1857, by President James Buchanan. Sinclair's time as a judge in the territory was tumultuous, as the following account explains:

Sinclair's resignation from the position was reported in April 1860. After leaving the court, he returned to his native Virginia to oppose secession. He also briefly edited a newspaper in Memphis, Tennessee. Returning to Virginia, he "was engaged by the confederacy in the secret service department in Richmond". After the war he resumed private practice in Richmond, and served in the Senate of Virginia, "where he was known as a fine linguist", and "made an enviable reputation both as a lawyer and an orator".

Early one morning, Sinclair was found dead on the floor at his home in Manassas, at the age of 59. Having appeared in good health the night before, his death was supposed to have resulted from apoplexy.

References

1820s births
1887 deaths
Year of birth uncertain
People from Virginia
Virginia state senators
Justices of the Utah Supreme Court
United States Article I federal judges appointed by James Buchanan